In computability theory, a function is called limit computable if it is the limit of a uniformly computable sequence of functions.  The terms computable in the limit, limit recursive and recursively approximable are also used.  One can think of limit computable functions as those admitting an eventually correct computable guessing procedure at their true value.  A set is limit computable just when its characteristic function is limit computable.

If the sequence is uniformly computable relative to D, then the function is limit computable in D.

Formal definition 

A total function  is limit computable if there is a total computable function  such that
 

The total function  is limit computable in D if there is a total function  computable in D also satisfying
 

A set of natural numbers is defined to be computable in the limit if and only if its characteristic function is computable in the limit.  In contrast, the set is computable if and only if it is computable in the limit by a function  and there is a second computable function that takes input i and returns a value of t large enough that the  has stabilized.

Limit lemma 

Moreover, the limit lemma (and its relativization) hold uniformly.

Proof 
As  is a [computably enumerable] set, it must be computable in the limit itself as the computable function can be defined
 

Fix sets  which are identified with their characteristic functions and a computable function  with limit . Suppose that  for some Turing reduction  and define a computable function  as follows

 
Now pick  such that for all  .

Limit computable real numbers 

A real number x is computable in the limit if there is a computable sequence  of rational numbers (or, which is equivalent, computable real numbers) which converges to x.   In contrast, a real number is computable if and only if there is a sequence of rational numbers which converges to it and which has a computable modulus of convergence.

When a real number is viewed as a sequence of bits, the following equivalent definition holds.  An infinite sequence  of binary digits is computable in the limit if and only if there is a total computable function  taking values in the set  such that for each i the limit  exists and equals .  Thus for each i, as t increases the value of  eventually becomes constant and equals .  As with the case of computable real numbers, it is not  possible to effectively move between the two representations of limit computable reals.

Examples 

 The real whose binary expansion encodes the halting problem is computable in the limit but not computable.
 The real whose binary expansion encodes the truth set of first-order arithmetic is not computable in the limit.
 Chaitin's constant.

See also 
 Specker sequence

References 

 J. Schmidhuber, "Hierarchies of generalized Kolmogorov complexities and nonenumerable universal measures computable in the limit", International Journal of Foundations of Computer Science, 2002, .
 R. Soare. Recursively Enumerable Sets and Degrees. Springer-Verlag 1987.
 V. Brattka. A Galois connection between Turing jumps and limits. Log. Methods Comput. Sci., 2018, .

Computability theory
Theory of computation